Mathias Antonsen Normann (born 28 May 1996) is a Norwegian professional footballer who plays as a midfielder for Russian side Dynamo Moscow, on loan from Rostov. He previously played for Norway, but has been banned from doing so given him signing to play for a Russian team during the 2022 Russian invasion of Ukraine.

Club career
Normann was born in Svolvær. He made his senior debut for Bodø/Glimt on 24 April 2014 against Tverlandet; Bodø/Glimt won 5–0. Normann played for Lofoten before he joined Bodø/Glimt.

On 16 August 2017, Normann joined Molde FK on loan until the end of the 2017 season. On 26 January 2018, Molde announced that Normann's loan deal had been extended until the summer of 2018.

On 28 January 2019, he signed with the Russian Premier League club FC Rostov.

On 29 August 2021, he joined English club Norwich City on loan for the 2021–22 season, with an option to purchase.

On 16 August 2022, Normann moved on loan to Lecce in Italy. On 18 August 2022, the Italian club announced Normann wouldn’t be part of the team due to bureaucratic reasons.

On 6 September 2022, Normann joined Dynamo Moscow on loan with an option to buy.

International
Normann made his debut for the Norway national team on 5 September 2019 in a 2020 Euro qualifier against Malta, as a 76th-minute substitute for Stefan Johansen.

After he signed a new contract with a Russian team, the Norwegian Football Federation banned him from playing for Norway. Norwegian manager Ståle Solbakken said: "We'll see if Mathias one day returns to the Norwegian national team, but right now it is completely out of the question."

Career statistics

Club

International

Scores and results list Norway's goal tally first, score column indicates score after each Normann goal

References

External links

 

1996 births
Living people
Banned sportspeople
People from Vågan
Norwegian footballers
Association football midfielders
FK Lofoten players
FK Bodø/Glimt players
Alta IF players
Brighton & Hove Albion F.C. players
Molde FK players
FC Rostov players
Norwich City F.C. players
FC Dynamo Moscow players
Norwegian First Division players
Eliteserien players
Russian Premier League players
Premier League players
Norway youth international footballers
Norway under-21 international footballers
Norway international footballers
Norwegian expatriate footballers
Expatriate footballers in England
Expatriate footballers in Russia
Norwegian expatriate sportspeople in England
Norwegian expatriate sportspeople in Russia
Sportspeople from Nordland